Adolf is a male given name.

Adolf may also refer to:
Adolf Hitler, leader of Nazi Germany

Adolf may also refer to:
Adolf (manga), a manga by Osamu Tezuka
Adolph (drama), a play by Pip Utton
Adolf Gun, a World War II artillery piece
Adolf Fredriks kyrka, a church in Stockholm, Sweden
Adolfo Suárez Madrid–Barajas Airport in Spain

See also
Adolff
Adolfo (disambiguation)
Adolphe (disambiguation)